The following is the discography of American disco and funk band KC and the Sunshine Band.

Albums

Studio albums

Live albums
Get Down Live! (1995, Intersound)
Live: Get Down Tonight (1998, EMI-Capitol) Rehashed and shortened to 10 Tracks rerelease of the 1995 Get Down Live! release.

Compilation albums

Singles

References

KC and the Sunshine Band
Discographies of American artists
Disco discographies